Grigory Shafigulin (born January 13, 1985) is a Russian former professional ice hockey player. He played in the Russian Superleague and the Kontinental Hockey League (KHL) for Lokomotiv Yaroslavl, Ak Bars Kazan, HC Vityaz, Torpedo Nizhny Novgorod, Dynamo Moscow, Metallurg Magnitogorsk, Amur Khabarovsk and Spartak Moscow. He was selected by Nashville Predators in the 3rd round (98th overall) of the 2003 NHL Entry Draft.

Career statistics

Regular season and playoffs

International

References

External links

1985 births
Living people
Volga Tatar people
Ak Bars Kazan players
Amur Khabarovsk players
HC Dynamo Moscow players
Dynamo Balashikha players
Lokomotiv Yaroslavl players
Metallurg Magnitogorsk players
Nashville Predators draft picks
HC Spartak Moscow players
Tatar people of Russia
Tatar sportspeople
Torpedo Nizhny Novgorod players
HC Vityaz players
Russian ice hockey centres